Buel is an unincorporated community located in McLean County, Kentucky, United States. It was also known as Pickaway.

References

Unincorporated communities in McLean County, Kentucky
Unincorporated communities in Kentucky